Jaime Yzaga was the defending champion but lost in the first round to Aaron Krickstein.

Richard Krajicek won in the final 7–6(7–5), 7–6(9–7), 2–6, 6–3 against Boris Becker.

Seeds

  Goran Ivanišević (first round)
  Boris Becker (final)
  Jaime Yzaga (first round)
  Jason Stoltenberg (first round)
  Patrick Rafter (semifinals)
  Paul Haarhuis (first round)
  Richard Krajicek (champion)
  David Wheaton (first round)

Draw

Finals

Section 1

Section 2

External links
 1994 Australian Indoor Championships draw

Singles